General transcription factor 3C polypeptide 4 is a protein that in humans is encoded by the GTF3C4 gene.

Interactions 

GTF3C4 has been shown to interact with GTF3C2, GTF3C1, POLR3C and GTF3C5.

References

Further reading